Spiperone (Spiroperidol; brand name: Spiropitan (JP)) is a typical antipsychotic and research chemical belonging to the butyrophenone chemical class. It is licensed for clinical use in Japan as a treatment for schizophrenia. Additionally, spiperone was identified by compound screening to be an activator of Ca2+ activated Cl− channels (CaCCs), thus a potential target for therapy of cystic fibrosis.

N-Methylspiperone (NMSP) is a derivate of spiperone that is used to study the dopamine and serotonin neurotransmitter system.
Labeled with the radioisotope carbon-11, it can be used for positron emission tomography.

References 

5-HT2A antagonists
Alpha-1 blockers
Butyrophenone antipsychotics
D2 antagonists
Fluoroarenes
Imidazolidinones
Spiro compounds
Typical antipsychotics